Constant Wagner (1 January 1941 – 27 October 2007) was a Luxembourgian sports shooter. He competed in the men's 10 metre air pistol event at the 1992 Summer Olympics.

References

External links
 

1941 births
2007 deaths
Luxembourgian male sport shooters
Olympic shooters of Luxembourg
Shooters at the 1992 Summer Olympics
People from Kayl